Rojer is a Dutch surname. Notable people with the surname include:

 Eldridge Rojer (born 1984), a Dutch football player
 Jean-Julien Rojer (born 1981), a Dutch tennis player
 Leendert Rojer (born ?), a Curaçaoan politician

Dutch-language surnames